Adrián Alonso Faúndez Cabrera (born August 5, 1989) is a Chilean footballer.

He began his career in the youth system of Universidad de Chile before making his debut in the 2009 Apertura tournament against Cobresal.

Honours

Club
Universidad de Chile
Primera División de Chile (1): 2009 Apertura

References

1989 births
Living people
Chilean footballers
Universidad de Chile footballers
Cobresal footballers
Association football wingers
People from Temuco